Mārtiņš Porejs (born July 6, 1991 in Riga) is a Latvian ice hockey player, currently playing for Dinamo Riga of Kontinental Hockey League. He played for SK Riga 18 and SK LSPA/Riga teams before joining HK Riga.

On November 23, 2012, he made his debut in KHL playing for Dinamo Riga on 1–0 win against Neftekhimik.

References

1991 births
Living people
Ice hockey people from Riga
Latvian ice hockey defencemen
HK Riga players
Dinamo Riga players
Dundee Stars players
Latvian expatriate ice hockey people
Latvian expatriate sportspeople in Scotland
Latvian expatriate sportspeople in Poland
Expatriate ice hockey players in Scotland
Expatriate ice hockey players in Poland